"Te soñare" (English: I'll dream you)  is a song by the Mexican band Vázquez Sounds that premiered on March 11, 2014. Te Soñare is included in the album called "Invencible," which contains 10 songs in Spanish.

Letter and dedication 
Te Soñare is inspired by universal love and the great power of dreams in humans, and they seek to convey that to their fans, according to the young musicians originating in Mexicali, Baja California. Dedicated to universal love and the great power of dreams in every human being, they represent a motivation to achieve what we want to fight for our goals, to act and to conceive much higher dreams.

Music video 
The video was recorded in Los Angeles, under the direction of Carlos Lopez Estrada and  Vazquez Sounds shows in a dream world.

Track list

References 

2014 songs